The company Heliatek was spun off in July 2006 from the Technical University of Dresden (IAPP) and the University of Ulm. The company's founding brought together internationally renowned expertise in the fields of organic optoelectronics and organic oligomer synthesis. Among related fields of operation, the company wants to be instrumental in establishing environmentally friendly solar energy as a widespread, commonplace technology.

In 2011 the company was recognized, by an audience other than professionals in the field, for winning the German Future Prize. The World Economic Forum awarded the firm as a Technology Pioneer in 2015.

See also
 Can Heliatek Get Organic PV to Market? 
 Heliatek achieves new world record for organic solar cells 
 SPIE TV: Karl Leo: Efficiency improvements are key to future of organic photovoltaics

References

Solar energy companies
Optoelectronics